Sampson William Francis Collins (born 21 September 1982 in London) is an English film-maker, journalist and author. He is best known as the director of the Grierson-nominated Documentary series Gazza on the treatment of the footballer Paul Gascoigne by the tabloid press, and the producer, co-director and co-writer of the award-winning documentary Death of a Gentleman, about corruption in the administration of cricket.

Death of a Gentleman was awarded Best Documentary at the prestigious Sports Journalism Awards in February 2016, beating off a strong shortlist including the highly commended Catch Me If You Can (a BBC Panorama investigation into allegations of doping in athletics), and One Day in May (BT Sport's story of the Bradford City fire).

Gazza broadcast on BBC Two in April 2022 and was nominated for 'Best Sports Documentary', and shortlisted for 'Best Series' at the 2022 Grierson Documentary Awards.

References

English journalists
English documentary filmmakers
1982 births
Living people
English film directors
English film producers